"Shine" is the debut single by American alternative rock band Collective Soul. It served as the lead single for their 1993 debut album, Hints Allegations and Things Left Unsaid. "Shine" would remain the band's most well known song and a hallmark of 1990s alternative rock. It became the number one Album Rock Song of 1994, and won a Billboard award for Top Rock Track. The song also reached the top of the Billboard Album Rock Tracks chart for eight weeks. The song then went on to peak at number 11 on the Billboard Hot 100 for one week.

VH1 would later rank "Shine" at number 42 on their list of the "100 Greatest Songs of the '90s". In 2012 a rerecorded version recorded by Collective Soul was released as a playable song for the game Rock Band Blitz. In 2015 the rerecorded version was released on the bonus Greatest Hits CD that was included with the Walmart exclusive deluxe edition of See What You Started by Continuing.

Overview
In a December 2017 interview with Songfacts, lead singer Ed Roland explained the origin of "Shine":

Due to the song's lyrical themes, particularly the mention of "heaven", Collective Soul was often early on regarded as a Christian band. Ed Roland elaborated, "I remember around the time ["Shine" came out] getting into an argument with a writer who said, 'You're a Christian band.' I said, 'No, we're not.' 'Well, you have the word heaven in your song.' And I said, 'Well, so does Led Zeppelin. I don't remember anyone saying they were a Christian band.'" He went on to stress that such classification would unite the bandmates' beliefs and that a particular doctrine cannot speak for all its members. Roland did note, however, his religious background and the fact that his father is a Southern Baptist minister, but that this does not justify a Christian label.

Collective Soul rhythm guitarist Dean Roland has called the song's chorus "basically a prayer" and noted that the uplifting single was released during an odd time amidst heavy grunge. He noted that despite the song's unique feel, this circumstance wrongfully pigeonholed the band as being grunge.

"Shine" features guitar with a slight distortion and mellow atmosphere throughout the verses. Its chorus pounds with staccato riffs before brightening up with the lyrics "Heaven let your light shine down." Later, the song's bridge modulates into double-time behind a hard rock guitar solo played by Ross Childress before returning to its previous state of calmness.

Music video
The song's video, was written and directed by William Levin, which achieved popularity on MTV, features various footage, largely black-and-white. Youths are seen carrying seemingly random items across a rural area and railroad tracks before arriving at an old shed and watching the band perform. "Shine" was included on the era-themed compilation Essential Music Videos: '90s Rock.

Legacy and appearances
"Shine" has remained a symbol of 1990s alternative rock. Stephen Thomas Erlewine of Allmusic regarded the song "a tremendous guilty pleasure, built on a guitar riff so indelible you swear it's stolen, blessed by a sighing melody that makes this a fine album-rock single that would have sounded as good in '74 as it did in '94."

Due to its popularity among 1990s music, "Shine" has been included on various era-themed compilation albums including VH1: I Love the '90s, Whatever: The '90s Pop and Culture Box, Big Shiny '90s, and The Buzz. Live versions have been included on the Woodstock '94 and Much at Edgefest 1999 compilations.

Track listing
All songs written by Ed Roland.
CD single
 "Shine" – 5:05
 "Scream" (non-LP B-side) – 3:00
 "Almost You" (non-LP B-side) – 2:58

Charts and certifications

Weekly charts

Year-end charts

Certifications

Cover versions
Phish poked fun at the song with their short version of "Shine" in the middle of "Fly Famous Mockingbird" at Madison Square Garden on New Year's Eve 1995 with the band's lyricist  Tom Marshall on vocals. This version can be found on the live album Phish: New Year's Eve 1995 – Live at Madison Square Garden.

Dolly Parton recorded a cover of "Shine" for her 2001 album Little Sparrow with members of the alt and bluegrass band Nickel Creek. Parton's recording of the song earned her a Grammy Award for Best Female Country Vocal Performance.

The Holmes Brothers recorded a cover of "Shine" for their 2004 album Simple Truths.

Charity Von recorded a cover of "Shine" for her eponymous 2004 album.

Pillar recorded a cover of "Shine" for their 2009 album  Confessions.

The Smashing Pumpkins played parts of "Shine" during their 2010 tour. Billy Corgan has expressed his hatred of the song and noted its similarities to the Smashing Pumpkins' song "Drown". Corgan lost a lawsuit in the mid-1990s to Ed Roland after Roland was able to produce a demo tape featuring "Shine" that preceded the Smashing Pumpkins' release.

A video uploaded by Girl Talk's Gregg Gillis titled "Collective Soul Cat" became popular in 2012 which featured the cat singing the famous "Yeah!" in the song's exact key.

References

1993 debut singles
1993 songs
2001 singles
2009 singles
Atlantic Records singles
Collective Soul songs
Dolly Parton songs
Nickel Creek songs
Post-grunge songs
Songs written by Ed Roland